The Wanskuck Library—Providence Community Library is an historic branch library building at 233 Veazie Street in Providence, Rhode Island.  It is a single-story brick and stone structure, built in 1928, replacing an earlier library building which had originally housed a library established by the Wanskuck Mill Company for its employees.  The building was designed by Clarke & Howe, and is an excellent local example of Colonial Revival design, with a tetrastyle entrance portico.  It was the first of ten libraries built based on Howe designs.

The building was listed on the National Register of Historic Places in 1998.

See also
National Register of Historic Places listings in Providence, Rhode Island
Rochambeau Library-Providence Community Library
South Providence Library-Providence Community Library
Smith Hill Library-Providence Community Library
Fox Point Library-Providence Community Library
Mount Pleasant Library-Providence Community Library
Olneyville Library-Providence Community Library
Washington Park Library-Providence Community Library
Knight Memorial Library-Providence Community Library

References

External links
Residents fight to keep library open
Providence Community Library website

Library buildings completed in 1928
Public libraries in Rhode Island
Libraries on the National Register of Historic Places in Rhode Island
Buildings and structures in Providence, Rhode Island
Education in Providence, Rhode Island
1928 establishments in Rhode Island
National Register of Historic Places in Providence, Rhode Island